is a Japanese politician and a member of the House of Representatives in the Diet (national legislature). A native of Kamo, Niigata, she graduated from a high school in Kamo and studied in Heilongjiang University in China. After having served in the assembly of Kamo for two terms since 1995, she ran unsuccessfully for the Niigata-4th seat in the House of Representatives in 2000 as a member of Ichirō Ozawa's Liberal Party, which merged into the DPJ in 2003. She ran again in 2003 and was elected for the first time.

References

External links 
 Official website in Japanese.

Living people
1969 births
Members of the House of Representatives (Japan)
Female members of the House of Representatives (Japan)
People from Niigata Prefecture
Liberal Party (Japan, 1998) politicians
Democratic Party of Japan politicians
21st-century Japanese politicians
21st-century Japanese women politicians